S Petit Nico is a French singer, songwriter and record producer.

He has composed songs for many artists, including  Grand Corps Malade, Rouda, Souleymane Diamanka and Ami Karim. He was also a pianist for Grand Corps Malade in his launching years in 2006 à 2007, and later with Kery James between 2008 and 2010. His compositions have also been used in theater works, in films in advertisements. With music in more than 30 shorts, he is the composer for the "La Famille" collective directed by Jacky Ido. He has taken part in many events including Les FrancoFolies de Montréal and Café de la Danse.

Discography

Studio albums
2002: Petit Nico (self-produced)
Track list:
 Seul
 J'aime
 Histoire de détail (feat Koko & Lordeul)
 La Différence (Fix M Cobra)
 Julie (feat Koko)
 Une Donnée
 Silver (Stereo)
 2 Visions
 Ouverture
 Bonus Track

2012: Humain
Track list:
Grandes âmes
Bidonville
Humains
Ce Monde
Courant
Femme
Une caresse de printemps
Aujourd'hui
Mélodie de mots
Bien à vous
Yankoff
Un homme en colère

EPs
2008: Si j'étais un homme
Track list:
Si j'étais un homme
Le mec chelou
Prendre son pied en main
Il et elle

Collaborations

Discs 
2006: Composer of 10 tracks in Grand Corps Malade album Midi 20 and album producer (Anouche Productions / AZ (label) / Universal) (Charts: FR #3, BEL #4, SWI #28)
2006: Composer and producer of "Muse amoureuse" on Souleymane Diamanka album L’hiver Peul (Anakroniq/Barclay Records/Universal)
2007: Won two Victoires de la musique awards for "Album revelation" and "Artist revelation on stage" for Midi 20
2007: Composer of "Je voulais juste que tu m'aimes" by Amel Bent (Jive-Epic/Sony BMG Music Entertainment)
2007: Composer and producer of 8 tracks for Ami Karim album Éclipse totale (Virgin/EMI Group)
2007: Composer and producer of 6 tracks don Rouda album Musique des lettres (Les Chants du Monde/Harmonia Mundi)
2008: Composer of 5 tracks on Grand Corps Malade's second album Enfant de la ville (Anouche Productions / AZ label / Universal) (FR #2, BEL #6, SWI #15)
2008: Composer of 2 tracks Sancho's  Imagine EP (Artside / Believe Digital)
2010: Composer of track "Roméo kiffe Juliette" on the third album of Grand Corps Malade 3ème temps (Anouche productions / AZ (label) / Universal)

Live 
2006-2007: Pianist and musical director for "Midi 20" tour for Grand Corps Malade
2008-2010: Pianist and musical arrangement for "A l'ombre du show-bizness" and "Réel" tours by Kery James
2010: Pianist and record producer for Lyor's No Mad Land project (129h Productions)

Soundtracks 
2008: Ma Poubelle Géante directed by Uda Benyamina
2008: Dead Buddy directed by Cédric Ido
2009: Lauréat Composer for emergence (L'Université d'été internationale du cinéma) for "Tous les chats sont gris (la nuit)" directed by Savina Dellicour
2011: Co-composer for cartoon Au loin directed by Studio Kippik

Theater (music) 
2003: Suzanne by Collectif Quatre Ailes
2005: Sir Semoule..., par le Collectif Quatre Ailes
2006: Des factures... Des gens... Et une petite histoire d'amour, directed by Yacine Belhousse
2009: Le projet RW by Collectif Quatre Ailes
2011: La Belle au bois de Jules Supervielle, by  Collectif Quatre Ailes
2012: L'Oiseau bleu of Maurice Maeterlinck, par le Collectif Quatre Ailes

Advertisements 
2009: Spot Citroën "C5 Snow Motion"
2009: Spot Wrangler "Why"

In popular culture
2009: Took part  in Kery James's "Désolé", a charity song for Espoir pour Haiti with various artists: Amel Bent, Awa Imani, Beethova Obas, Christophe Maé, Davy Sicard, Diam's, Jacob Desvarieux, Jena Lee, Kayna Samet, Kenza Farah, Kery James, Natasha St-Pier, Souad Massi, S Petit Nico, Tiken Jah Fakoly, William Baldé, Youssou N'Dour

References

External links 
 Official website
  Vidéo Sujet TV M6

French songwriters
Male songwriters
1982 births
Living people
21st-century French singers
21st-century French male singers